Rehalkar is situated in Kangra tehsil and located in Kangra district of Himachal Pradesh, India. It is one of 175 villages in Kangra Block along with villages like Taqipur and Choharu . Nearby railway station of Rehalkar is Kangra.

References

External links
The Rehalkar

Villages in Kangra district